Pierre-Bénite is a commune in the Metropolis of Lyon in Auvergne-Rhône-Alpes region in eastern France.

Geography
Pierre-Bénite, a suburb around 6 kilometers (3.73 miles) south of Lyon, extends over 440 hectares (1087.26 acres) on the right bank of the river Rhône, alongside the A7 motorway.  It is limited to the north by Lyon, to the west by Oullins, to the southwest by Saint-Genis-Laval, to the south by Irigny, and to the east by the Rhône, across from Saint-Fons.

Population

See also
Communes of the Metropolis of Lyon

References

Communes of Lyon Metropolis
Lyonnais